Michelle Duncan (born 14 April 1978) is a Scottish-Canadian actress, known for Driving Lessons (2006), Atonement (2007) and The Broken (2008). She portrayed Shelley Stern in the biographical drama film Bohemian Rhapsody (2018).

Early life
The Perth-born Duncan studied acting at Queen Margaret University College before studying English and classics at St Andrews University.

Career
Duncan's television roles include Sugar Rush, Doctor Who, Low Winter Sun, and Lost in Austen. She played Princess Diana in a TV film, Whatever Love Means, opposite Olivia Poulet as Camilla Parker Bowles and Laurence Fox as Prince Charles. 

Film work includes: Atonement, The Broken,  and as Rupert Grint's love interest in Driving Lessons with Julie Walters. 
Duncan's role in Atonement was particularly praised by The New Yorker theatre critic Anthony Lane: Duncan's stage work includes Time and the Conways (Bath Theatre Royal/ touring), A Midsummer Night's Dream  and The Burning at the Edinburgh Festival Fringe.

Further television work includes: New Tricks  Call the Midwife. Duncan lent her voice to an adaptation of "The Little Mermaid" by Hans Christian Andersen at Little Angel Puppet Theatre in 2006 alongside Dame Judi Dench, Sir Michael Gambon, Rory Kinnear, Claudie Blakley, Rosamund Pike, Claire Rushbrook and Peter Wight.

In 2007 she was cast as Portia  in The Merchant of Venice at Shakespeare's Globe, but was unable to continue after the previews and was replaced by Kirsty Besterman. In 2012 Duncan appeared alongside Amanda Hale in Scrubber, a film written and directed by Romola Garai. In 2013, Duncan appeared in the third series of the BBC TV drama Luther and Case Histories. In 2014, she appeared in the ITV drama Grantchester.

In 2015 she starred alongside Ruth Negga, Douglas Henshall and Tom Brooke in Scott Graham's Film "Iona". The closing gala film of the Edinburgh Film Festival. She took the role of Bea (originally performed by Helen Baxendale) in Deborah Bruce's play The Distance, directed by Charlotte Gwinner, for Sheffield and the Orange Tree Theatres.

In 2018, Duncan played Shelley Stern in the Queen biopic Bohemian Rhapsody.

Filmography

Film

Television

Awards and nominations

References

External links

Living people
Scottish television actresses
Scottish film actresses
Scottish stage actresses
Scottish voice actresses
Alumni of the University of St Andrews
Alumni of Queen Margaret University
20th-century Scottish actresses
21st-century Scottish actresses
People from Perth, Scotland
Scottish Shakespearean actresses
1978 births